The New Land is a 1974 American dramatic television series about a Swedish immigrant family to the United States trying to establish a life in rural Minnesota in 1858, loosely based on the Academy Award-nominated Swedish film The Emigrants and its sequel, The New Land. It stars Scott Thomas, Bonnie Bedelia, and Kurt Russell. It aired on ABC from September 14 to October 19, 1974.

Cast
 Bonnie Bedelia as Anna Larsen
 Scott Thomas as Christian Larsen
 Todd Lookinland as Tuliff Larsen
 Debbie Lytton as Annaliese Larsen
 Kurt Russell as Bo Larsen
 Donald Moffat as Reverend Lundstrom
 Gwen Arner as Molly Lundstrom
 Lou Frizzell as Murdock
 James Olson as Johansen

Synopsis
Christian and Anna Larsen immigrate from Sweden to the United States with their children, nine-year-old Tuliff and eight-year-old Annaliese, in 1858 and settle in the wilderness outside Solna, Minnesota, where they set about establishing a new life for themselves and their family. Also there is Christians brother Bo. Reverend Lundstrom and his wife Molly live in the area, and Murdock is the proprietor of the local general store.

Production
William Blinn was the executive producer of The New Land. Philip Leacock produced the show and directed at least one of its episodes. Blinn wrote for the show, as did Gerry Day, Ray Goldrup, Bethel Leslie, Larry Brody, Michael Michaelian, and Katharyn Powers.

Loosely based on two Swedish movies, 1971s The Emigrants and 1972s The New Land, the show was filmed on location in California and central Oregon, near Sunriver.

Popular singer John Denver sang the theme song for The New Land.

Critical reception
The New Land received almost universal acclaim from critics, many of whom compared it favorably with the hit series The Waltons. In the Los Angeles Times, reviewer Cecil Smith wrote that The New Land "seems to catch the rich, grainy earthiness of pioneer life, of clawing a living out of the hard land with the same effectiveness The Waltons mirror the Depression."

Broadcast history
The New Land premiered on ABC on September 14, 1974, but drew low ratings despite its critical acclaim. Its 7.9 rating was substantially lower than that of All in the Family (29.3) and Friends and Lovers (21.3) on CBS and Emergency! (19.7) on NBC in the same time slot. It was cancelled after the broadcast of its sixth episode on October 19, 1974. Seven additional episodes never aired.

The New Land aired Saturdays at 8:00 p.m. EDT/PDT throughout its brief run.

Episodes
Sources

References

External links

Theme song to The New Land (performed by John Denver) and still photos from the show on YouTube

American Broadcasting Company original programming
1974 American television series debuts
1974 American television series endings
1970s American drama television series
English-language television shows
Television shows set in Minnesota
Television shows filmed in Oregon
Films about immigration to the United States
Works about Swedish-American culture
Live action television shows based on films